Pati tehsil is a fourth-order administrative and revenue division, a subdivision of third-order administrative and revenue division of Barwani district of Madhya Pradesh.

Geography
Pati tehsil has an area of 669.80 sq kilometers. It is bounded by Alirajpur district in the northwest, Dhar district in the north, Barwani tehsil in the northeast, east and southeast, Pansemal tehsil in the south and southwest and Maharashtra in the west.

See also 
Barwani district

Citations

External links

Tehsils of Madhya Pradesh
Barwani district